In 1974, Wales was re-divided for local government purposes into thirty-seven districts.  Districts were the second tier of local government introduced by the Local Government Act 1972, being subdivisions of the eight counties introduced at the same time.  This system of two-tier local government was abolished in 1996 and replaced with the current system of unitary principal areas.

Each district was administered by an elected district council. The council was entitled to petition for a charter granting borough status, whereupon the district became a borough and the district council a borough council headed by a mayor. In addition, a district could be granted Letters Patent granting city status.

For the list of districts before 1974, see List of rural and urban districts in Wales in 1973.

Districts 1974–1996

 Outside the district.

References

 

Administrative divisions of Wales
Districts